Under i september (lit. Wonders in September) is the ninth novel by Swedish author 
Klas Östergren. It was published in 1994.

References

 

1994 Swedish novels
Novels by Klas Östergren
Swedish-language novels
Novels set in Scania
Albert Bonniers Förlag books